Noduliferola is a genus of tortrix moths (family Tortricidae) belonging to the tribe Eucosmini of subfamily Olethreutinae. The known species range from East Asia to Polynesia.

At least some of them can be recognized by their hindwing veins. In these species, vein 3 and 4 are united, and approached by the fifth vein at its end.

Species
 Noduliferola abstrusa Kuznetzov, 1973
 Noduliferola anepsia Razowski, 2013
 Noduliferola atriplaga (Clarke, 1976)
 Noduliferola hylica (Diakonoff, 1984)
 Noduliferola insuetana Kuznetzov, 1997
 Noduliferola marquesana (Clarke, 1986)
 Noduliferola neothela (Turner, 1916)
 Noduliferola niphada (Diakonoff, 1984)
 Noduliferola phaeostropha (Clarke, 1976)
 Noduliferola pleurogramma (Clarke, 1976)
 Noduliferola spiladorma (Meyrick, 1932)

Footnotes

References
  (2010a): Online World Catalogue of the Tortricidae – Genus Noduliferola account. Version 2.0. Retrieved 2011-OCT-15.
  (2010b): Online World Catalogue of the Tortricidae – Noduliferola species list. Version 2.0. Retrieved 2011-OCT-15.
  (1986): Pyralidae and Microlepidoptera of the Marquesas Archipelago. Smithsonian Contributions to Zoology 416: 1-485. PDF fulltext (214 MB!)

Eucosmini
Tortricidae genera